Ayrshire is an unincorporated community in Patoka Township, Pike County, in the U.S. state of Indiana.

History
A post office was established at Ayrshire in 1886, and remained in operation until 1917. The community probably took its name from Ayrshire, in Scotland.

Geography

Notes

Unincorporated communities in Pike County, Indiana
Unincorporated communities in Indiana